Sri Lankan provincial council elections, 2014 may refer to:

 March 2014 Sri Lankan provincial council elections
 September 2014 Sri Lankan provincial council election

2014 in Sri Lanka